Ask the Passengers is a young adult novel by A. S. King, published October 23, 2012 by Little, Brown Books for Young Readers. In 2012, the book won the Los Angeles Times Book Prize for Young Adult Literature.

Reception 
Ask the Passengers was generally well-received, including starred reviews from Booklist, The Horn Book, Kirkus Reviews, Publishers Weekly, and Shelf Awareness.

Kirkus Reviews called Ask the Passengers "[q]uite possibly the best teen novel featuring a girl questioning her sexuality written in years." Publishers Weekly said the book was "[f]unny, provocative, and intelligent," noting that it "celebrates love in all of its messy, modern complexity."

On behalf of The Bulletin of the Center for Children's Books, Deborah Stevenson wrote, "For kids struggling with their own truths, it can be hard to believe how much light there is once you come out of the cave. This is a book that knows and understands that, and it's one that readers will believe."

References 

Little, Brown and Company books
2012 children's books
Novels set in Pennsylvania
LGBT young adult literature
Novels with lesbian themes